The rufous-capped warbler (Basileuterus rufifrons) is a New World warbler native from Mexico south to Guatemala, rarely occurring as far north as southeastern Arizona and south Texas. Birds in the southern part of the range are now split out as a separate species, as the chestnut-capped warbler (Basileuterus delattrii).

They are plain-olive to olive-gray, with white underbellies, bright yellow chests and throats, and a distinctive facial pattern consisting of a rufous cap, a white eyebrow-line (or superciliary), a dark eye-line fading into a rufous cheek, and a white malar marking. The bill is rather stout for a warbler, the wings are round and stubby, and the tail is long, often raised at a high angle and flicked.

While rufous-capped warblers are generally birds of tropical shrubby highlands, North American sightings tend to be in oak woodland canyon bottoms, near running water, while the birds stay low in dense vegetation.

Like other New World warblers, this species does not actually warble. Male rufous‐capped warblers have complex songs with many syllable types shared both within and between males’ repertoires. The males also show seasonal, temporal and annual variation in their song use.

Rufous-capped warblers primarily feed on insects and spiders, foraging through dense brush and scanning close to the ground for movement. They are not generally known to flycatch from perches.

References

External links

 
 
 
 Rufous-capped warbler at Animal Diversity Web (University of Michigan)
 

rufous-capped warbler
rufous-capped warbler
Birds of Central America
Birds of Colombia
rufous-capped warbler